Dancemaker is a 1998 American documentary film directed by Matthew Diamond about the career of choreographer Paul Taylor. It was nominated for an Academy Award for Best Documentary Feature. Walter Scheuer, one of the producers, was a longtime trustee of the Paul Taylor Dance Company. After its theatrical run, it aired on the PBS series American Masters.

References

External links

Dancemaker at American Masters

1998 films
1998 documentary films
American documentary films
American independent films
Documentary films about modern dance
Films directed by Matthew Diamond
1998 directorial debut films
1990s English-language films
1990s American films